Louisiana Creole is a French-based creole language spoken by fewer than 10,000 people, mostly in the state of Louisiana. Also known as Kouri-Vini, it is spoken today by people who may racially identify as White, Black, mixed, and Native American, as well as Cajun and Creole. It should not be confused with its sister language, Louisiana French, a dialect of the French language. Many Louisiana Creoles do not speak the Louisiana Creole language and may instead use French or English as their everyday languages.

Due to the rapidly shrinking number of speakers, Louisiana Creole is considered an endangered language.

Origins and historical development

Louisiana was colonized by the French beginning in 1699, as well as Canadians who were forced out of Acadia around the mid-18th century. Colonists were large-scale planters, small-scale homesteaders, and cattle ranchers who had little success in enslaving the indigenous peoples who inhabited the area; the French needed laborers as they found the climate very harsh. They began to import enslaved Africans, as they had for workers on their Caribbean island colonies. It is estimated that, beginning about 1719, a total of 5,500 persons were transported from the Senegambia region of West Africa. These people originally spoke a Mande language related to Malinke. They were in contact with enslaved people speaking other languages, such as Ewe, Fon, and Igbo. The importation of enslaved people by the French regime continued until 1743.

The language developed in 18th-century Louisiana from interactions among speakers of the lexifier language of Standard French and several substrate or adstrate languages from Africa. Prior to its establishment as a creole, the precursor was considered a pidgin language. The social situation that gave rise to the Louisiana Creole language was unique, in that the lexifier language was the language found at the contact site. More often the lexifier is the language that arrives at the contact site belonging to the substrate/adstrate languages. Neither the French, the French-Canadians, nor the enslaved Africans were native to the area; this fact categorizes Louisiana Creole as a contact language that arose between exogenous ethnicities. Once the pidgin tongue was transmitted to the next generation as a lingua franca (who were considered the first native speakers of the new grammar), it could effectively be classified as a creole language.

No standard name for the language has existed historically. In the language, community members in various areas of Louisiana and elsewhere have referred to it by many expressions, though Kréyol/Kréyòl has been the most widespread. Until the rise of Cajunism in the 1970s and 1980s, many Louisiana Francophones also identified their language as Créole, since they self-identified as Louisiana Creoles. In Louisiana's case, self-identity has determined how locals identify the language they speak. This leads to linguistic confusion. To remedy this, language activists beginning in the 2010s began promoting the term Kouri-Vini, to avoid any linguistic ambiguity with Louisiana French.

The boundaries of historical Louisiana were first shaped by the French, then in statehood after 1812 took on its modern form. By the time of the Louisiana Purchase by the U.S in 1803, the boundaries came to include most of the Central U.S, ranging from present-day Montana; parts of North Dakota, Wyoming, Colorado; all of South Dakota, Nebraska, and Kansas; part of Southeast Texas; all of Oklahoma; most of Missouri and Arkansas; as well as Louisiana.

In 1978, researchers located a document from a murder trial in the colonial period that acknowledges the existence of Louisiana Creole.  The documentation does not include any examples of orthography or structure.

In an 1807 document, a grammatical description of the language is included in the experiences of an enslaved woman recorded by C.C. Robin. This was prior to arrival in Louisiana of French-speaking colonists and enslaved Africans from Saint-Domingue; the whites and free people of color (also French speaking), were refugees from the Haitian Revolution, that had established the first empire in the western hemisphere. The statements collected from Robin showed linguistic features that are now known to be typical of Louisiana Creole.

The term “Criollo” appears in legal court documents during the Spanish colonial period (1762-1803); the Spanish reference to the language stated that the language was used among enslaved people and whites.

The importation of enslaved Africans increased after France ceded the colony to Spain in 1763, following France's defeat by Great Britain in the Seven Years' War in Europe. Some Spaniards immigrated to the colony, but it was dominated by French language and culture. Like South Carolina, Louisiana had a "minority" population of Africans that greatly outnumbered the European settlers, including those white Creoles born in the colony.

Language shift, endangerment and revitalization
In the case of Louisiana Creole, a diglossia resulted between Louisiana Creole and Louisiana French. Michael Picone, a lexicographer, proposed the term "Plantation Society French" to describe a version of French which he associated with plantation owners, plantation overseers, small landowners, military officers/soldiers and bilingual, free people of color, as being a contributor to Louisiana Creole's lexical base. Over the centuries, Louisiana Creole's negative associations with slavery stigmatized the language to the point where many speakers are reluctant to use it for fear of ridicule. In this way, the assignment of "high" variety (or H language) was allotted to standard Louisiana French and that of "low" variety (or L language) was given to Louisiana Creole and to Louisiana French.

The social status of Louisiana Creole further declined as a result of the Louisiana Purchase. Americans and their government made it illegal for Louisiana Creoles to speak their language. Public institutions like schools refused to teach children in their native tongue and children and adults were often punished by corporal punishment, fines, and social degradation. By the 21st century, other methods were enforced. The promise of upward socioeconomic mobility and public shaming did the rest of the work, prompting many speakers of Louisiana Creole to abandon their stigmatised language in favor of English. Additionally, the development of industry, technology and infrastructure in Louisiana reduced the isolation of Louisiana Creolophone communities and resulted in the arrival of more English-speakers, resulting in further exposure to English. Because of this, Louisiana Creole exhibits more recent influence from English, including loanwords, code-switching and syntactic calquing.

Today, Louisiana Creole is spoken by fewer than 6,000 people. Though national census data includes figures on language usage, these are often unreliable in Louisiana due to respondents' tendencies to identify their language in line with their ethnic identity. For example, speakers of Louisiana Creole who identify as Cajuns often label their language 'Cajun French', though on linguistic grounds their language would be considered Louisiana Creole.

Efforts to revitalize French in Louisiana have placed emphasis on Cajun French, to the exclusion of Creole. A small number of community organizations focus on promoting Louisiana Creole, for example CREOLE, Inc. and the 'Creole Table' founded by Velma Johnson. Northwestern State University developed the Creole Heritage Centre designed to bring people of Louisiana Creole heritage together, as well as preserve Louisiana Creole through their Creole Language Documentation Project. In addition, there is an active online community of language-learners and activists engaged in language revitalization, led by language activist Christophe Landry. These efforts have resulted in the creation of a popular orthography, a digitalized version of Valdman et al.'s Louisiana Creole Dictionary, and a free spaced repetition course for learning vocabulary hosted on Memrise created by a team led by Adrien Guillory-Chatman. A first language primer was released in 2017 and revised into a full-length language guide and accompanying website in 2020. 2022 saw the publication of an anthology of contemporary poetry in Louisiana Creole, the first book written completely in the language.

Geographic distribution
Speakers of Louisiana Creole are mainly concentrated in south and southwest Louisiana, where the population of Creolophones is distributed across the region. St. Martin Parish forms the heart of the Creole-speaking region. Other sizeable communities exist along Bayou Têche in St. Landry, Avoyelles, Iberia, and St. Mary Parishes. There are smaller communities on False River in Pointe-Coupée Parish, in Terrebonne Parish, and along the lower Mississippi River in Ascension, St. Charles Parish, and St. James and St. John the Baptist parishes.

There once were Creolophones in Natchitoches Parish on Cane River and sizable communities of Louisiana Creole-speakers in adjacent Southeast Texas (Beaumont, Houston, Port Arthur, Galveston) and the Chicago area. Louisiana Creole speakers in California reside in Los Angeles, San Diego and San Bernardino counties and in Northern California (San Francisco Bay Area, Sacramento County, Plumas County, Tehama County, Mono County, and Yuba County). Historically, there were Creole-speaking communities in Mississippi and Alabama (on Mon Louis Island); however, it is likely that no speakers remain in these areas.

Phonology
The phonology of Louisiana Creole has much in common with those of other French-based creole languages. In comparison to most of these languages, however, Louisiana Creole diverges less from the phonology of French in general and Louisiana French in particular.

Consonants 

The nasal palatal  usually becomes a nasal palatal approximant when between vowels, which results in the preceding vowel becoming nasalized.

Vowels 

The table above shows the oral and nasal vowels of Louisiana Creole as identified by linguists.

Vowel rounding 
Speakers of the language may use rounded vowels ,  and  where they occur in French. This is subject to a high degree of variation with the same region, sociolinguistic group, and even within the same speaker. Examples of this process include:

  'rice', compare French du riz 
  'old', compare French vieux 
  'mouth', compare French gueule

Vowel lowering 
'brother'.

Regressive and progressive nasalization of vowels 
In common with Louisiana French, Louisiana Creole vowels are nasalized where they precede a nasal consonant, e.g.  'young',  'apple'. Unlike most varieties of Louisiana French, Louisiana Creole also exhibits progressive nasalization: vowels following a nasal consonant are nasalized, e.g.  'know'.

Grammar
Louisiana Creole exhibits subject-verb-object (SVO) word order.

Determiners 
In nineteenth century sources, determiners in Louisiana Creole appear  related to specificity. Bare nouns are non-specific. As for specific nouns, if the noun is pre-supposed it took a definite determiner (-la, singular; -la-ye, plural) or by an indefinite determiner (en, singular; de or -ye, plural). Today, definite articles in Louisiana Creole vary between the le, la and lê, placed before the noun as in Louisiana French, and post-positional definite determiners -la for the singular, and -yé for the plural. This variation is but one example of the influence of Louisiana French on Louisiana Creole, especially in the variety spoken along the Bayou Têche which has been characterized by some linguists as decreolized, though this notion is controversial.

Some speakers of that variety display a highly variable system of number and gender agreement, as evidenced in possessive pronouns.

Personal pronouns 

Possession is shown by noun-noun possessum-possessor constructions (e.g. lamézon mô papa  'house (of) my grandfather') or with the preposition a (e.g. lamézon a mô papa 'house of my grandfather').

Verbs

Verbal morphology 
Older forms of Louisiana Creole featured only one form of each verb without any inflection, e.g.  'to eat'. Today, the language typically features two verb classes: verbs with only a single form ( 'to drink') and verbs with a 'long' or 'short' form ('to eat').

Tense, aspect, mood 
Like other creole languages, Louisiana Creole features preverbal markers of tense, aspect and mood as listed in the table below

Vocabulary
The vocabulary of Louisiana Creole is primarily of French origin, as French is the language's lexifier. Some local vocabulary, such as topography, animals, plants are of Amerindian origin. In the domains folklore and Voodoo, the language has a small number of vocabulary items from west and central African languages. Much of this non-French vocabulary is shared with other French-based creole languages of North America, and Louisiana Creole shares all but a handful of its vocabulary with Louisiana French.

Writing system

The current Louisiana Creole alphabet consists of twenty-three letters of the ISO basic Latin alphabet (not including c, q, or x) and several special letters and diacritics.

{| class="wikitable"
!Letter
!Name 
!Name (IPA)
!Diacritics
!Phoneme correspondence
|-
| A a || a ||  ||Áá, Àà, Ââ || 
|-
| Æ æ || æ ||  || || 
|-
| B b || bé ||  || || 
|-
| Ç ç || çé ||  || || 
|-
| D d || dé ||  || || 
|-
| E e || e ||  || Éé, Èè, Êê, Ëë || e = ; é = ; è = 
|-
| F f || èf ||  || || 
|-
| G g || gé ||  || || 
|-
| H h || hash ||  || || 
|-
| I i || i ||  || Íí, Ìì, Îî, Ïï || i = ; ì = 
|-
| J j || ji ||  || || 
|-
| K k || ka ||  || || 
|-
| L l || èl ||  || || 
|-
| M m || èmm ||  || || 
|-
| N n || ènn ||  || || 
|-
| Ñ ñ || ñé ||  || || 
|-
| O o || o ||  ||Óó, Òò, Ôô, Öö || o = ; ò = 
|-
| Œ œ || œ ||  || || 
|-
| P p || pé ||  || || 
|-
|-
| S s || ès ||  || || 
|-
| T t || té ||  || || 
|-
| U u || u ||  || Ûû || 
|-
| V v || vé ||  || || 
|-
| W w || double-vé ||  || || 
|-
| Y y || igrek ||  || Ÿÿ || 
|-
| Z z || zèd ||  || || 
|}

{| class="wikitable"
!Digraph
!Name 
!Name (IPA)
!Phoneme correspondence
|-
| ch || ché ||  || 
|-
| dj || djé ||  || 
|-
| ou || ou ||  || 
|-
| sh || shé ||  || 
|-
| Nasals || || ||
|-
| an, am, en, em || || || 
|-
| in, im || || || 
|-
| on, om || || || 
|-
| un, um || || || 
|}

Language samples

Numbers

{| class="wikitable"
!Number
!French
!Louisiana Creole
|-
| 1 || un || un, in
|-
| 2 || deux || dé
|-
| 3 || trois || trò, trwa
|-
| 4 || quatre || kat
|-
| 5 || cinq || sink
|-
| 6 || six || sis
|-
| 7 || sept || sèt
|-
| 8 || huit || wit
|-
| 9 || neuf || nèf
|-
| 10 || dix || dis
|}

Greetings

Common phrases

The Lord's Prayer
Catholic prayers are recited in French by speakers of Louisiana Creole. Today, some language activists and learners are leading efforts to translate the prayers.

Nouzòt Popá, ki dan syèl-la
Tokin nom, li sinkifyè,
N'ap spéré pou to
rwayonm arivé, é n'a fé ça
t'olé dan syèl; parèy si latær
Donné-nou jordi dipin tou-lé-jou,
é pardon nouzòt péshé paréy nou pardon 
lê moun ki fé nouzòt sikombé tentasyon-la,
Mé délivré nou depi mal.

See also

 Louisiana Creole people
 Louisiana French
 Haitian Creole
 Franglais
 Frespañol

References

Sources

 Partial preview at [ Google Books].

Further reading
 Partial preview at [ Google Books].

External links
 Learn Louisiana Creole
 Louisiana Creole Dictionary - Online
 Learn Pointe-Coupée Parish Creole
 Brian J. Costello – La Language Créole de la Paroisse Pointe Coupée
 Centenary University Bibliothèque Tintamarre Texts in Louisiana Creole
 Christophe Landry, Ph.D.  
 Le bijou sur le Bayou Teche
 
 "Allons Manger" Cajun French with Creole dialect
 

 English - Louisiana creole Glosbe dictionary
 louisiana creole - English Glosbe dictionary

 
Louisiana Creole culture
Endangered pidgins and creoles
French-based pidgins and creoles
French-American culture in Louisiana
French language in the United States
African-American culture
African-American English
Languages of the African diaspora
Languages of Louisiana